Ohlertidion thaleri is a species of comb-footed spider in the family Theridiidae. It is found in the Russian Far East.

References

Theridiidae
Spiders described in 1988
Spiders of Asia